Emmochliophis fugleri, the Pinchinda snake,  is a species of snake of the family Colubridae. The species is found in Ecuador.

References

Emmochliophis
Endemic fauna of Ecuador
Reptiles of Ecuador
Reptiles described in 1969
Taxa named by Hobart Muir Smith